Moon Hee-joon (or spelled Moon Hee-jun; born March 14, 1978) is a South Korean pop rock singer-songwriter signed under SidusHQ. He initially rose to fame as the leader of former boy band H.O.T. under SM Entertainment.

Biography

1996–2001: H.O.T.

Being the second member to join H.O.T. after auditioning, Moon made his debut as a singer as the leader of the boy group. The group debuted with their first album, We Hate All Kinds of Violence in September 1996, which was accused of being plagiarized and lawsuits were placed against them. Despite their controversial debut, the group eventually rose to fame with their first hit, Candy and We Are the Future, which the latter won them a MTV award for Best International Video. During his time as part of the group, Moon composed and wrote music for the group and with fellow member, Jang Woo-hyuk, he often choreographed the group's dance routine. Despite H.O.T.'s success, after releasing their last album, Outside Castle in September 2000, the group disbanded in May 2001.

2001–2005: Solo artist and leaving S.M. Entertainment
After the disbandment of the group, Moon stayed on in S.M. Entertainment with Kangta, who was also part of H.O.T., and debuted as a solo artist. Moon attempted to establish a rock music career with his first album, Alone, but received criticism from the public. His second album, Messiah, was tinted with controversy as one of the songs, Media, was banned from all 3 major broadcasting stations in South Korea, for attacking mass media. After the release of his third album, Legend, in 2003, Moon released The Best: Soaring for a Dream, his last album under S.M. Entertainment and created his own company, PS Entertainment. After Moon released his fourth album, Triple X, he enlisted in the army in 2005.

2006–2009: Military service, SidusHQ and comeback 
Before entering the army, Moon had signed a contract with SidusHQ and during his time in the army, he hosted the KFN Korean Army Broadcast "Music Talk Show", which received recognition from various Korean artistes. In 2008, Moon released his fifth album, Special Album, which included songs from H.O.T. previous albums. Moon released his first mini album, Last Cry, in 2009. In the same year, Moon appeared in sitcom Taehee, Hyegyo, Jihyun and took a break from the music scene.

2010–present: Other activities, Begins, HotSechgodRG
Despite being absent from the music scene, Moon took up hosting in several variety programs such as, Immortal Songs: Singing the Legend, Mnet's 'Wide Celebrity News' and other programs. In 2013, Moon released his second mini album, Begins, after being away from the music scene from 3 years. It was released on January 18, 2013.

Moon, his H.O.T. bandmate Tony An and three members of disbanded or inactive fellow first-generation idol groups Eun Ji-won of Sechs Kies, Danny Ahn of g.o.d and Chun Myung-hoon of NRG starred in their own variety-reality television show Handsome Boys of the 20th Century. He had conceived the idea following the success of Reply 1997 and invited the four other entertainers, all of whom were born in the same year (1978), to star in a reality version of the show. They called their "group" HOTSechgodRG, which is made up of each of their idol group names. They have since appeared on shows such as KBS's Happy Together SBS's Running Man. Due to the reuniting of Eun's group Sechs Kies and Danny Ahn's group g.o.d, they have not appeared as a five-some since the 2014 show Where is My Superhero?, which aired on OnStyle, due to busy schedules but remain close friends. The group, except Eun, most recently met at Moon's bachelor party which was shown on My Little Old Boy, the reality show that Tony An was participating in.

In 2015, Moon signed an exclusive contract with KOEN Stars.

Personal life

On November 25, 2016, Moon announced that he would be marrying fellow entertainer Park Hye-Kyeong, also known as Soyul of Crayon Pop. The wedding was held on February 12, 2017, in Seoul. The pair then welcomed their first child, daughter Moon Hee-yul, on May 12, 2017. On February 5, 2022 the couple announced of their second pregnancy. Their second child, son Moon Tae-myung was born on September 7, 2022.

Discography

Studio albums

Other albums

Extended plays

Singles

Filmography

Variety Shows

Awards and nominations

References

External links 
 SidusHQ Star Page 

H.O.T. (band) members
IHQ (company) artists
South Korean pop rock singers
South Korean male singers
South Korean singer-songwriters
South Korean record producers
South Korean television presenters
South Korean male idols
South Korean Buddhists
Male actors from Seoul
1978 births
Living people
Singers from Seoul
South Korean male singer-songwriters